Tse Uk is the name of several villages in Hong Kong:

 Tse Uk Tsuen (Yuen Long District) in Yuen Long District
 Tse Uk Village in Sha Tin District
 Tse Uk, a hamlet part of Tan Ka Wan